Vila (trans. Fairy) is the third studio album by Serbian recording artist Emina Jahović, which was released on 21 May 2009, by PGP RTS. Because Jahović signed a contract with PGP RTS she was banned on RTV Pink, a famous Serbian TV network that supports artists from City Records which released Emina's first two albums.

Background
Emina recorded the album over the past two years. She wrote the most songs by herself, except "Ne zaboravi" which is written and produced by Aleksandra Milutinović, who also worked on Emina's previous albums, and "Zver", which is co-written and co-produced by Dino Merlin. There is a duet with Dino on the album, "Med", which is written and produced by Emina. It is the only song that Dino ever sang that he hadn't written by himself. Emina said that she had written "Još ti se nadam" after she had broken up with Mustafa in 2006. She also said that she had chosen the name Vila for the album because she thinks that it's the best song she had ever written, so she wanted people to pay attention to it.

Release
The album was released through PGP RTS on 21 May 2009.

Track listing

Notes
 Indicates a co-composer

References

2009 albums
Emina Jahović albums
PGP-RTS albums